Isocrania is an extinct genus of brachiopods found during the Upper Cretaceous. Early representatives were attached to the underground, but later species are presumed to be free living at an increasingly earlier age. This was probably an adaptation to the increasing very thick and fine sedimentation during the latest Cretaceous.

Description 
Isocrania is round to ovate, up to 1 cm in diameter, and has 15-65 strong ribs, that start at ±½mm from the origin of growth (or umbo). These ribs may extend beyond the edge of the valves. The umbo is not precisely in the centre of the valve. The attachment area is smaller than usual, and virtually absent in adults of later species. The dorsal valve is conical, the ventral valve flat to conical, flatter for adolescents and earlier species. The inner edge of the valves is flattened and grainy.

Species and distribution 
 I. campaniensis is known from the Upper Cretaceous of Belgium (Upper Campanian, Craibel Quarry, Obourg, Craie d'Obourg and Craie de Trivieres Formations, 50.4° N, 3.9° E).
 I. costata has been found in the Upper Cretaceous of France (Lower Campanian, d'Avezac Formation, Tercis, 43.7° N, 1.1° W; and Upper Campanian, Tercis, Les Vignes Formation), Denmark (Maastrichtian, Nye Klov 3-7, 55.5° N, 12.5° E) and the Lower Paleogene of Denmark (Lower Danian, Nye Klov 8, 9 and 20-28, 55.5° N, 12.5° E). This species occurs in sediments from quiet, deep, off-shore waters, which is consistent with the fact that the preservation state is excellent and many specimens have boring holes testifying that they were predated by molluscs.

See also 
 List of brachiopod genera
 Taxonomy of commonly fossilised invertebrates

References

Prehistoric brachiopod genera
Turonian genus first appearances
Paleocene genus extinctions
Craniata